Marvin Albert Carlson (born September 15, 1935) is an American theatrologist, currently the Sidney E. Cohn Distinguished Professor at City University of New York, and also previously the Walker-Ames Professor at University of Washington. A largely collected author, his work covers mainly the history of theatre in Europe from the 18th to the 20th century.

Selected works
 Performance: A Critical Introduction. Routledge, 1980 
 The Haunted Stage: The Theatre as Memory Machine. University of Michigan Press, 2003 
 Speaking in Tongues: Languages at Play in the Theatre. University of Michigan Press, 2009 
 Shattering Hamlet's Mirror: Theatre and Reality. University of Michigan Press, 2016 
 Ten Thousand Nights: Highlights from 50 Years of Theatre-Going.  University of Michigan Press, 2017

References

1935 births
Living people
Theatrologists
Historians of theatre
City University of New York faculty
Cornell University alumni